Leeds Rowing Club is a British Rowing affiliated club in the city of Leeds, West Yorkshire. It was founded in 2006. The club is based in two locations, its main boathouse is on the canal at Stourton by Thwaites Mill in the south of the city, while its Learn to Row and recreational rowing sessions happen at Roundhay Park, to the north of the City centre. The club row in dark blue, with a vertical yellow stripe between two white stripes down both sides. Blades are dark blue with a lighter blue tip.

History
Up until 2006, there were no clubs rowing in Leeds. Leeds Schools Boat Club were no longer in operation, and Leeds University Boat Club rowed on the River Ouse in York. Leeds Rowing Club is the first open membership rowing club in the city, and caters for adults and juniors of all abilities.

Facilities
The club has two boathouses. The original one at Waterloo Lake that opened in 2006 and a brand new facility that opened in 2014.

The Waterloo Lake boathouse on the 800m Waterloo Lake, in Roundhay Park, Leeds. Is where the club bases all of its learn to row courses and recreational rowing.

In late 2014 the club, in conjunction with Leeds University, moved into a brand new club house built on the Leeds Canal. The new club house provides the club with almost 4 km worth of water to train on, much improved gym and changing areas and a much larger boathouse, allowing both Leeds RC and Leeds University to dramatically increase the size of their fleets.

The new gym area in the club house, overlooking the canal, has space enough for 12 rowing machines and weights area, that is more than twice the size of the old clubhouse weights area at Waterloo Lake.

The club races in all categories of boats and has a growing fleet of high performance boats from Filippi.

Races
The club competes in regattas and head races across the UK, ranging from heads and regattas in the Yorkshire Region through to competing at the Tideway Heads as well as Henley Women's Regatta and Henley Royal Regatta. Athletes from Leeds Rowing Club have made the Semi Final of the Club Coxed Four event at Henley Women's Regatta as well as racing four consecutive years in a row at Henley Royal Regatta, twice in the Wyfold Challenge Cup and twice in the Thames Challenge Cup. In 2018, Leeds Rowing Club pre-qualified for the first time in the Thames Challenge Cup. The Masters Squad have competed and won at the British Rowing Masters Championships as well as racing at the FISA World Masters Regatta.

References

External links
 Leeds Rowing Club Website

Rowing clubs in England
Sport in Leeds
2006 establishments in England
Sports clubs established in 2006